Jacques Tardi (born 30 August 1946) is a French comic artist. He is often credited solely as Tardi.

Biography
Tardi was born on 30 August 1946 in Valence, Drôme. After graduating from the École nationale des beaux-arts de Lyon and the École nationale supérieure des arts décoratifs in Paris, he started drawing comics in 1969, at the age of 23, in the Franco-Belgian comics magazine Pilote, initially illustrating short stories written by Jean Giraud and Serge de Beketch, before creating the political fiction story Rumeur sur le Rouergue from a scenario by Pierre Christin in 1972.

In the English language, many of Tardi's books are published by Fantagraphics Books, edited and translated by Fantagraphics' co-founder Kim Thompson.

In 2013, Tardi was nominated as a Chevalier in France's Legion of Honour, the country's highest distinction. However, he turned down the distinction, citing that he will "remain a free man and not be held hostage by any power whatsoever."

Awards
 1974: Grand Prix Phénix
 1975: Award for Best French Artist at the Angoulême International Comics Festival, France
 – Grand Prix for Black Humor
 1977: Best Foreign Artist at the Prix Saint-Michel, Belgium
 1982: Award for best comic by "l'Association 813" at the Festival du Polar in Reims
 1985: Grand Prix de la ville d'Angoulême, France
 – Knighted in the Ordre des Arts et des Lettres, France
 1986: Adamson Award, Sweden
 1990: Best German-language Comic/Comic-related Publication at the Max & Moritz Prizes, Germany
 1991: Special mention at the Best Promotional Comic Award at the Angoulême International Comics Festival
 1994: Audience Award at the Angoulême International Comics Festival
 – Best German-language Comic/Comic-related Publication at the Max & Moritz Prizes, Germany
 1998: nominated for the Award for Best Comic Book at the Angoulême International Comics Festival
 2002: Audience Award and Award for Artwork at the Angoulême International Comics Festival
 – nominated for the Prix de la critique and the Canal BD Award at the Angoulême International Comics Festival
 2003: nominated for the Audience Award at the Angoulême International Comics Festival
 2004: nominated for Best American Edition of Foreign Material at the Harvey Awards, U.S.
 2005: nominated for Award for a Series at the Angoulême International Comics Festival
 2006: nominated for the Award for Best Comic Book and the Audience Award at the Angoulême International Comics Festival
 2006: Special Prize for outstanding life's work at the Max & Moritz Prizes, Germany
 – nominated for the Grand Prix Saint-Michel
 2007: nominated for the Grand Prix Saint-Michel
 2010: nominated for the Press Prize at the Prix Saint-Michel
 2011: winner of two Eisner Awards
 2021: winner of Einhard-Preis

Bibliography

Scenario and artwork
  followed by La Fleur au fusil (Casterman, 1974)
  (with characters by Léo Malet) (Casterman, 1974), 
  (Futuropolis, 1974)
  (Yellow Submarine, 1979)
 Déprime (Futuropolis, 1981)
  (Imagerie Pellerin, 1984), 
 C'était la guerre des tranchées (Casterman, 1993), 
 Les Aventures extraordinaires d'Adèle Blanc-Sec (Casterman, 1976–2022)
 "Adèle et la bête" (1976), 
 "Le Démon de la tour Eiffel" (1976), 
 "Le Savant fou" (1977), 
 "Momies en folie" (1978), 
 "Le Secret de la salamandre" (1981), 
 "Le Noyé à deux têtes" (1985), 
 "Tous des monstres !" (1994), 
 "Le Mystère des profondeurs" (1998), 
 "Le Labyrinthe infernal" (2007), 
 "Le Bébé des Buttes-Chaumont" (2022).
  (Casterman, 2008),  
 Moi, René Tardi, Prisonnier de guerre – stalag IIB (Casterman, 2012),

Adaptations
 , based on novels by Léo Malet (Casterman, 1982–2000)
  (Casterman, 1982), 
  (Casterman, 1988), 
 Une gueule de bois en plomb (Casterman, 1990), 
  (Casterman, 1996), 
  (Casterman, 2000), 
 Jeux pour mourir based on a novel by Géo-Charles Véran (Casterman, 1992), 
 Le Der des Ders, based on a novel by Didier Daeninckx (Casterman, 1997), 
 , based on a novel by Jean Vautrin (Casterman, 2001–2004)
 Les canons du 18 mars (2001), 
 L'espoir assassiné (2002), 
 Les heures sanglantes (2003), 
 Le testament des ruines (2004), 
  (Les Humanoïdes Associés, 2005), based on a novel by Jean-Patrick Manchette
  (Casterman, 2006), based on a novel by Pierre Siniac
 La Position du tireur couché (Futuropolis, 2010), based on a novel by Manchette
  (Futuropolis, 2011), based on a novel by Manchette

Artwork
  (scenario by Pierre Christin) (Gallimard, 1976)
  (scenario by Philippe Picaret) (Futuropolis, 1977)
  (scenario by Jean-Patrick Manchette) (Square, then Dargaud, then Casterman, 1978)
  (scenario by Jean-Claude Forest) (Casterman, 1979), 
  (scenario by ) (Casterman, 1984), 
 Grange bleue (scenario by ) (Futuropolis, 1985)
 Le sens de la houppelande (scenario by Daniel Pennac) (Futuropolis, 1991), 
 Un strapontin pour deux (scenario by Michel Boujut) (Casterman, 1995)
 L'évasion du cheval gris (scenario by Claude Verrien) (Sapristi, 1996)
 Sodome et Virginie (scenario by Daniel Prevost) (Casterman, 1996), 
  (scenario by Didier Daeninckx) (L'Association, 1999), 
  (scenario by Daniel Pennac) (Futuropolis, 2000),

Scenario
 Le voyage d'Alphonse (artwork by Antoine Leconte) (Duculot, 2003)

Sketchbooks
 Mine de plomb (Futuropolis, 1985)
 Chiures de gommes (Futuropolis, 1985)
 Tardi en banlieue (Casterman, 1990), 
 Carnet (JC Menu, 2001),

Illustrated novels
Céline adaptations:
 Voyage au bout de la nuit (Futuropolis, 1988), 
 Casse-pipe (Futuropolis, 1989), 
 Mort à crédit (Futuropolis, 1991), 

Jules Verne adaptations:
 Un prêtre en 1839 (Cherche Midi, 1992), 
 San Carlos (Cherche Midi, 1993),

Novel
 Rue des Rebuts (Alain Beaulet, 1990)

In English
 Adèle and the Beast – Adèle et la bête (NBM Publishing 1990), 
 The Demon of the Eiffel Tower – Le Démon de la tour Eiffel (NBM Publishing, 1990), 
 The Mad Scientist and Mummies on Parade – Le Savant fou and Momies en folie (NBM Publishing, 1996), 
 The Secret of the Salamander – Le Secret de la salamandre (NBM Publishing, 1992)
 The Bloody Streets of Paris – 120, rue de la Gare (iBooks, 2003), 
 West Coast Blues – Le petit bleu de la côte ouest (Fantagraphics, 2009), 
 You Are There – Ici Même (Fantagraphics, 2009), 
 It Was the War of the Trenches – C'était la guerre des tranchées (Fantagraphics, 2010) 
 The Extraordinary Adventures of Adèle Blanc-Sec Vol. 1: Pterror Over Paris and The Eiffel Tower Demon – Adèle et la bête and Le Démon de la tour Eiffel (Fantagraphics, 2010), 
 The Arctic Marauder – Le Démon des glaces (Fantagraphics, 2011) 
 Like a Sniper Lining Up His Shot – La Position du tireur couché (Fantagraphics, 2011), 
 The Extraordinary Adventures of Adèle Blanc-Sec Vol. 2: The Mad Scientist and Mummies on Parade – Le Savant fou and Momies en folie (Fantagraphics, 2011), 
 Goddamn This War – Putain de Guerre! (Fantagraphics, 2013), 
 Run Like Crazy Run Like Hell – Ô dingos, ô châteaux! (Fantagraphics, 2015), 
 Fog Over Tolbiac Bridge: A Nestor Burma Mystery – Brouillard au pont de Tolbiac (Fantagraphics, 2017), 
 I, Rene Tardi, Prisoner of War in Stalag IIB (Fantagraphics, 2018), 
 I, Rene Tardi, Prisoner of War in Stalag IIB Vol. 2: My Return Home (Fantagraphics, 2019), 
 I, Rene Tardi, Prisoner of War in Stalag IIB Vol. 3: After the War (Fantagraphics, 2020), 
 Streets of Paris, Streets of Murder: The Complete Noir Stories of Manchette & Tardi Vol. 1 – Collects Griffu & West Coast Blues (Fantagraphics, 2020), 
 Streets of Paris, Streets of Murder: The Complete Noir Stories of Manchette & Tardi Vol. 2 – Collects Like a Sniper Lining Up His Shot & Run Like Crazy Run Like Hell (Fantagraphics, 2020), 
 Farewell, Brindavoine (Fantagraphics, 2021),

Notes

References
 Tardi publications in Pilote, (A SUIVRE) and Métal Hurlant BDoubliées 
 Tardi albums Bedetheque

Further reading
 Olivier Maltret, Presque tout Tardi (Sapristi, 1996), 
 Michel Boujut, Tardi par la fenêtre (Christian Desbois, 1996)
 Numa Sadoul, Tardi. Entretiens. (Niffle, 2000)

External links
 Tardi official site on Casterman 
 Tardi biography on Lambiek Comiclopedia
 Les Aventures Extraordinaires d'Adèle Blanc-Sec  Fan site, dead link 

1946 births
Living people
People from Valence, Drôme
French comics artists
French comics writers
Grand Prix de la ville d'Angoulême winners
École nationale supérieure des arts décoratifs alumni
French male writers
Légion d'honneur refusals